Paradidyma is a genus of flies in the family Tachinidae.

Species

Paradidyma affinis Reinhard, 1934
Paradidyma albifacies (Wulp, 1892)
Paradidyma aldrichi Reinhard, 1934
Paradidyma angusticornis (Townsend, 1892)
Paradidyma apicalis Reinhard, 1934
Paradidyma aristalis Reinhard, 1934
Paradidyma armata (Townsend, 1915)
Paradidyma atatula (Walker, 1853)
Paradidyma bicincta (Reinhard, 1934)
Paradidyma brasiliana Reinhard, 1934
Paradidyma cinerescens Reinhard, 1934
Paradidyma conica (Townsend, 1891)
Paradidyma contigua (Wulp, 1890)
Paradidyma crassiseta Reinhard, 1934
Paradidyma derelicta Reinhard, 1934
Paradidyma jamaicensis Curran, 1928
Paradidyma melania (Townsend, 1919)
Paradidyma merista Reinhard, 1953
Paradidyma mexicana (Brauer & von Bergenstamm, 1893)
Paradidyma neglecta (West, 1925)
Paradidyma neomexicana Reinhard, 1934
Paradidyma obliqua Reinhard, 1934
Paradidyma orbitalis Coquillett, 1904
Paradidyma palpalis Townsend, 1927
Paradidyma peruana (Townsend, 1928)
Paradidyma peruviana Townsend, 1928
Paradidyma petiolata Reinhard, 1934
Paradidyma piliventris Reinhard, 1934
Paradidyma recincta Reinhard, 1964
Paradidyma reinhardi Wood, 1998
Paradidyma rufipes Curran, 1926
Paradidyma rufopalpus Curran, 1926
Paradidyma setigera (Coquillett, 1904)
Paradidyma singularis (Townsend, 1891)
Paradidyma townsendi (Williston, 1896)
Paradidyma trifasciata (Wulp, 1890)
Paradidyma validinervis (Wulp, 1890)

References

Tachininae
Taxa named by Friedrich Moritz Brauer
Taxa named by Julius von Bergenstamm